Semitool was a semiconductor manufacturing/capital equipment company based in Kalispell, Montana.

History
The company designed, developed, manufactured high performance and precision chemical processing equipment. Products included electrochemical deposition systems for electroplating copper, gold, solder and other metals; surface preparation systems for cleaning, stripping and etching silicon wafers; and wafer transport container cleaning systems. 

Their main competitors were the Austrian company SEZ, Solid State Equipment Corp. (SSEC), and American FSI International.

Applied Materials
In 2009, Semitool was acquired by Applied Materials.  It operates Semitool as a business unit and still operates the facility in Kalispell.

References

External links
  Applied Materials: Semitool products

Defunct semiconductor companies of the United States
Defunct manufacturing companies based in Montana
Kalispell, Montana
Manufacturing companies established in 1979
Technology companies established in 1979
Manufacturing companies disestablished in 2009
1979 establishments in Montana
2009 disestablishments in Montana
Manufacturing companies based in Montana